is a Japanese football player.

Career
He received his first appearance professional match on April 20, 2014, starting against JEF United Chiba.

Club statistics
Updated to 20 February 2017.

References

External links
Profile at FC Maruyasu Okazaki

1991 births
Living people
Yamanashi Gakuin University alumni
Association football people from Kanagawa Prefecture
Japanese footballers
J2 League players
J3 League players
Japan Football League players
Kataller Toyama players
FC Maruyasu Okazaki players
Association football defenders